Americo Sapienza (born February 8, 1936) is a former American football player who played with the New York Titans. He played college football at Villanova University.

References

1936 births
Living people
American football defensive backs
Villanova Wildcats football players
New York Titans (AFL) players
Players of American football from Boston